Nguyên Tiên Bân (born 1939) was a Vietnamese botanist, who worked principally at the Institute of Ecology and Biological Resources in the Vietnam Academy of Science and Technology.

Life 
Bân was a Professor and served as the Head of the Botany Department at the Institute of Ecology and Biological Resources in Hanoi. He worked primarily on Annonaceae and Magnoliaceae.

Legacy 
He is the authority for at least 97 taxa including:

References 

Living people
1939 births
Vietnamese botanists